The New Laos National Stadium is a multi-use stadium in Vientiane, Laos that was built in 2009. It is used mostly for football matches. It hosted the opening and closing ceremonies for the 2009 Southeast Asian Games.

Overview
Upon completion, it replaced the previous Laos National Stadium. The Laos National Sports Complex is located about 17 km from the centre of Vientiane City and comprises a 25,000-seat main stadium, a 2,000-seat indoor aquatics complex, with an outdoor warm-up pool, a tennis centre consisting of 2,000 seating capacity centre court plus six other tennis courts, two indoor stadiums each with a seating capacity of 3,000 and an indoor shooting range with 50 seats.

See also
 Stadium diplomacy

References

External links
 FootballFans.eu: New Laos National Stadium
 cafe.daum.net/stade: Nouveau Stade National du Laos
 Soccerway: New Laos National Stadium
 Stadionwelt: Laos National Stadium
 World Stadiums: Laos National Stadium
 Worldstadia: Laos National Stadium, Vientiane
 Flickr: Photostream of the Lao SEA Games Stadiums

Football venues in Laos
Buildings and structures in Vientiane
Tourist attractions in Vientiane
Sports venues completed in 2009
Chinese foreign aid
China–Laos relations
National stadiums